Martin H. Peretz (born December 6, 1938) is an American former magazine publisher and educator. Formerly an assistant professor at Harvard University, he purchased The New Republic in 1974 and assumed editorial control shortly afterwards. He founded the financial news website TheStreet.com in 1996 with personality and hedge fund manager Jim Cramer. Peretz is known for his strong support of Israel as well as his approval of the US invasion of Iraq in 2003. He retained majority ownership of The New Republic until 2002, when he sold a two-thirds stake in the magazine to two financiers. Peretz sold the remainder of his ownership rights in 2007 to CanWest Global Communications, though he retained his position as editor-in-chief. In March 2009, Peretz repurchased the magazine with a group of investors led by ex-Lazard executive Laurence Grafstein. In late 2010, Peretz gave up his title of editor-in-chief at The New Republic, becoming instead editor emeritus, and terminated his blog The Spine, after other editors and writers at the magazine said they found it offensive and that Peretz would never have had the opportunity to write it if not for the fact that he had been owner of the magazine. He no longer has any association with the magazine.

Early life and education
Peretz grew up in New York City. Both of his parents were Zionist, but not religious, Jews. He is a descendant of the Polish-Yiddish writer I. L. Peretz.

Peretz graduated from the Bronx High School of Science at age 15. He received his BA degree from Brandeis University in 1959, and MA and also a PhD from Harvard University in Government, then going on to lecture in Harvard's Social Studies program.

Personal life
Peretz was married briefly in his twenties to Linda Heller, the daughter of prominent citrus growers who lived on Fifth Avenue, and in Miami Beach. The pair had met in Boston. The ceremony took place at the Plaza Hotel. They separated shortly thereafter.

From 1967 to 2009, Peretz was married to Anne Devereux (Labouisse) Farnsworth Peretz, daughter of Henry Richardson Labouisse, Jr. and an heir to the  Singer Sewing Machine Company fortune. Together they helped finance Ramparts magazine in the 1960s, until it published articles critical of Israeli policy, whereupon Peretz withdrew his own support and that of his wife. In 1974, Peretz purchased The New Republic from Gilbert Harrison with funds of  $380,000 supplied by his wife.

The couple divorced in 2009, his wife citing multiple infidelities and an "explosive temper" as problems in the marriage.

Peretz is the father of the director Jesse Peretz and the writer Evgenia Peretz. Peretz is a long-time friend, former teacher, and political supporter of former US Vice President Al Gore.

Career

After Peretz purchased the magazine in 1974, he allowed its then editor, Gilbert Harrison, to continue editing the magazine. Peretz had pledged to let him continue running the magazine for at least three years. But by 1975, Peretz, increasingly agitated at having his own articles rejected for publication—pointing out he had been pouring more and more money into the magazine to cover its losses—he fired Harrison. Much of the rest of the staff, including Walter Pincus, Stanley Karnow, and Doris Grumbach, were either fired or quit. They were largely replaced by recent Harvard graduates lacking journalistic experience. Peretz then named himself the magazine's new the editor, serving in that post until 1979. In 1980, the magazine endorsed the liberal Republican John B. Anderson, running as an independent, rather than the Democratic incumbent, Jimmy Carter. Over time, Peretz purged the magazine of other progressive editors and writers, as the magazine underwent a dramatic ideological transformation. As other editors were appointed, Peretz remained editor-in-chief until 2012.

During Peretz's stewardship of The New Republic, the magazine generally maintained liberal and neoliberal positions on economic and social issues, while assuming correspondingly pro-Israel and neoconservative hawkish stances on foreign affairs.

Journalist Robert Parry wrote of Peretz's tenure as owner of the magazine: "Though The New Republic still touts its reputation as 'liberal', that label has been essentially a cover for its real agenda: pushing a hawkish foreign policy agenda that included the Reagan administration’s slaughter of Central Americans in the 1980s, violent US interventions in Iraq, Syria and other Muslim countries for the past two decades, and Israel’s suppression of Palestinians forever."

Regarding Israel, Peretz has said "Support for Israel is deep down, an expression of America's best view of itself." Alexander Cockburn and Ken Silverstein have stated that Peretz said "I am in love with the state of Israel." In a December 27, 2012 article, "Martin Peretz: An Appreciation," Jerusalem Post columnist Caroline Glick praised Peretz for his unshakable loyalty to Israel: "As a man of the Left, he has fought the fight for Israel and Jewish rights, increasingly alone for nearly fifty years, and has done so despite what must have been enormous personal costs as his comrades all jumped ship, and in many cases, joined the cause of Israel's enemies."

Media critic Eric Alterman wrote in the American Prospect regarding Peretz's tenure as editor of the New Republic, Peretz used the magazine to attack, tarnish, and marginalize people and institutions with which he personally or politically disagreed: "[D]uring his reign, Peretz has also done lasting damage to the cause of American liberalism. By turning TNR into a kind of ideological police dog, Peretz enjoyed... [playing] a key role in defining the borders of 'responsible' liberal discourse, thereby tarring anyone who disagreed as irresponsible or untrustworthy. But he did so on the basis of a politics simultaneously so narrow and idiosyncratic—in thrall almost entirely to an Israel-centric neoconservatism."

During his entire tenure as owner of The New Republic Peretz repeatedly has used the magazine's editorial pages of to attack and marginalize individuals whom he perceives as enemies of Israel, among them even many mainstream Israeli politicians and activists whom he disagreed with.—"sometimes we attack people unfairly" according to his close friend and TNR literary editor Leon Wieseltier. For example, Peretz attacked the late I. F. Stone, after the journalist signed a public appeal for the provision of water and medical supplies for siege victims trapped in West Beirut during the 1982 Israeli Siege of Beirut: Peretz editorialized, "So this is what I. F. Stone has come to, asking his admirers to put up money so that the PLO can continue to fight." In an editorial titled "Blacklisted", Peretz claimed during the first Persian Gulf War in 1991 that he was "the only writer on the Middle East not invited by PBS or NPR to speak about the Gulf."

In 1997, Peretz fired Michael Kelly as the editor of The New Republic after Kelly refused to publish a ghostwritten, unsigned editorial defending Peretz's former student and friend, Al Gore, who was then Vice President, and likely to run for the presidency when Bill Clinton's term was over. Kelly told The Washington Post that his "firing-by-phone came days after he refused to publish an unsigned item by Peretz saying that recent allegations of improper fund-raising by Gore were overblown and old news."  Kelly further explained: "I didn't think that should be our editorial position. I wrote him a memo saying, Here's why I think you're wrong and I'm right."  In an interview with The New York Times, Kelly added: "As long as Marty Peretz has the involvement with Al Gore and with the magazine to the degree that he does, I think the job is structurally impossible."

Peretz has long supported both Democrats and Republicans. As he aged, his support moved from progressives and liberal candidates to neoliberals and conservatives. He was a major behind-the-scenes benefactor of Eugene McCarthy's primary presidential bid in 1968. He supported Senator Barack Obama in both his Democratic primary race and in the 2008 general election, but in 2012 wrote that he hoped that "maybe Barack Obama will be a one-term president," and that a prominent alternative candidate would run against him in the Democratic primary. Later, Peretz expressed disappointment with Obama, telling The New York Times Magazine: "I'm not sure I feel betrayed, but it's close... our first African-American president has done less to fight AIDS in Africa than George Bush, he's done nothing on human rights."

Accusations of bigotry
Over the course of his career, Peretz has drawn criticism from several of his fellow commentators, particularly Jack Shafer of Slate, James Fallows of The Atlantic, and Eric Alterman of The Nation for making bigoted comments, often directed towards Arabs and Muslims. He has written (among other things) that "'Arab society' is 'hidebound and backward' [and] [t]hat the Druze are 'congenitally untrustworthy'".

On September 4, 2010, Peretz drew media attention and controversy when he posted an editorial which concluded:
But, frankly, Muslim life is cheap, most notably to Muslims. And among those Muslims led by the Imam Rauf there is hardly one who has raised a fuss about the routine and random bloodshed that defines their brotherhood. So, yes, I wonder whether I need honor these people and pretend that they are worthy of the privileges of the First Amendment which I have in my gut the sense that they will abuse.

New York Times columnist Nicholas Kristof denounced Peretz's comments, asking: "Is it possible to imagine the same kind of casual slur tossed off about blacks or Jews?"

Peretz issued an apology on September 13. On his statement about Muslims and the First Amendment, Peretz said: "I wrote that, but I do not believe that. I do not think that any group or class of persons in the United States should be denied the protections of the First Amendment, not now, not ever." Peretz also said that his comment that "Muslim life is cheap, most notably to Muslims" was "a statement of fact, not of value" and pointed out that Kristof himself agreed that Muslims have not adequately condemned violence perpetrated by Muslims on fellow Muslims.

Kristof responded by criticizing Peretz for falsely claiming that Kristof agreed with him, and also for continuing to generalize that all Muslims had the attitude of Muslim terrorists toward human life:

On September 17, 2010, Peretz issued yet another apology:

On September 20, 2010, five major Harvard student organizations, citing Peretz's long "history of making terribly racist statements" urged Harvard not to go ahead with honors planned for Peretz. The organizations—the Harvard Islamic Society, Latinas Unidas, and the Harvard Black Students Association—asserted that Peretz over the course of more than a decade had not only made racist comments against Muslims, but also regarding African Americans and Mexicans.

Also following the controversy, Harvard University canceled Peretz's scheduled September 25 speech on the occasion of the 50th anniversary of Harvard's Social Studies Department where Peretz once taught.

The Atlantic'''s James Fallows summarized Peretz's reputation, concluding that if his legacy were settled that day, despite being "beloved by many students and respected by some magazine colleagues", in his 70s he would be considered a bigot. Fallows also wrote: "Martin Peretz has been undeniably shamed. And lastingly shamed."

Marc Tracy wrote in the Jewish magazine The Tablet:

[I]f you will—this is not the first time he has written something racist, and it isn't the fifteenth time, either... But the tonnage of these quotations and the consistency of their content demonstrate that Peretz's insensitivity and bigotry toward Muslims and Arabs (er, and black people) yank him out of the realm of people you should be reading on the subject.

Jefferson Morley, a Peretz friend, who worked at The New Republic from 1983 to 1987, told Jack Shafer of Slate, "I could never reconcile this intellectual strength with his racism and unpleasant attempts to play the bully."

Allegations of gender bias in hiring practices
In January 2015, The New Republic, after having been purchased by a new owner, Chris Hughes, published a long, detailed report on the magazine's history of alleged racism. The article, by journalist Jeet Heer, also alleged that during Peretz's tenure as owner of The New Republic, women were rarely if ever given opportunities to write or edit for the magazine:

One may also ask if a staff dominated by privileged white males might not have benefited from greater diversity, and not just along racial lines. "Marty [Peretz] doesn't take women seriously for positions of responsibility," staff writer Henry Fairlie told Esquire magazine in 1985. "He's really most comfortable with a room full of Harvard males." In a 1988 article for Vanity Fair, occasional contributor James Wolcott concurred, noting, "The New Republic has a history of shunting women to the sidelines and today injects itself with fresh blood drawn largely from male interns down from Harvard." When Robert Wright succeeded Michael Kinsley in 1988, he joked he was hired as part of an 'affirmative action program' since he went to Princeton, not Harvard."

Sexual harassment controversy
On October 24, 2017, Leon Wieseltier, a former literary editor at The New Republic (from 1983 until his resignation in 2014), admitted to “offenses against some of my colleagues in the past” after several women accused him of sexual harassment and inappropriate sexual advances.

According to The New York Times:  "Several women... said they were humiliated when Mr. Wieseltier sloppily kissed them on the mouth, sometimes in front of other staff members. Others said he discussed his sex life, once describing the breasts of a former girlfriend in detail. Mr. Wieseltier made passes at female staffers, they said, and pressed them for details about their own sexual encounters.

"Mr. Wieseltier often commented on what women wore to the office, the former staff members said, telling them that their dresses were not tight enough. One woman said he left a note on her desk thanking her for the miniskirt she wore to the office that day."

One woman whom Wieseltier harassed, Sarah Wildman, a former assistant editor of The New Republic, has written that she was fired in retaliation for complaining: "In disclosing this incident to my superiors, the outcome was, in many ways, far worse than the act itself. It’s not exactly that I was disbelieved; it’s that in the end, I was dismissed", she wrote in Vox.

Wildman wrote that the sexual harassment went hand in hand with gender discrimination at the magazine during Peretz's tenure: "The women knew we had a far shallower chance of rising up the masthead than our male counterparts; all of us hoped we’d be the exception. To do so, we entered into a game in which the rules were rigged against us, sometimes pushing us well past our point of comfort in order to remain in play."

Peretz later said he knew nothing of the harassment. But Peter Beinart, an editor of the magazine, later said and wrote that when he reported one such incident in particular to Peretz—Wieseltier's harassment of Wildman—he was ignored, allowing the harassment to continue.

Peretz responded to Beinart's recollection of the two men specifically meeting to discuss the matter by saying: "Peter never, ever, ever reported this to me.” He added: "I don't remember Sarah Wildman."

Stephen Glass controversy
During Peretz's tenure as editor of The New Republic, the magazine faced one of journalism's most infamous fabrication scandals. One of the magazine's then writers, Stephen Glass, was found to have fabricated portions of or the entirety of 27 of 41 stories he wrote for the magazine. Stories were found to have included some accurate reporting interwoven with fabricated quotations, scenes, and incidents. In some instances, stories were completely invented and contained no factual content.

The Glass fabrications were "the greatest scandal in the magazine's history and marked a decade of waning influence and mounting financial losses", The New York Times later assessed.

In popular culture
In the 1993 novel Blue Hearts, set in Washington D.C., PBS news anchor Jim Lehrer included Peretz as the roman à clef character "Jonathan Perry".

Lehrer wrote of the fictional Perry:He was a lightweight sociology professor of no special talent or accomplishment who owned and edited the magazine The New World because his wife was a shoe company heiress who bought it for him. He was a joke in all circles except those that believed money was important...[he] had made himself even more foolish by writing a recent column accusing the producers of...public television and radio, of blacklisting him for his strong pro-Israel views. It was an embarrassing incoherence that only the owner of a publication could have brought to public print.

The incident described in Lehrer's novel apparently derived from real life. Press critic Jack Shafer noted that Peretz, in a column titled "Blacklisted," described having "leaned on NPR News Veep Bill Buzenberg for just a little mike (to no avail) and that he told PBS's Jim Lehrer he wouldn't turn down a date on The MacNeil/Lehrer NewsHour, either." Lehrer was said to have never offered Peretz an invitation to appear on his show.

Peretz is portrayed in Stephen Glass's 2003 novel The Fabulist and by Ted Kotcheff in the 2003 film Shattered Glass, based on the Glass controversy.

Honors and awards
Peretz has seven honorary doctorates: the honorary degree of Doctor of Laws from Bard College (1982), Coe College (1983), Long Island University (1988), Brandeis University (1989), Hebrew College (1990), Chicago Theological Seminary (1994), and the degree of Doctor of Philosophy honoris causa from the Hebrew University of Jerusalem (1987)."

In 1993, Harvard inaugurated the Martin Peretz Chair in Yiddish Literature in his honor. The Chair is currently held by Ruth Wisse.

Peretz has been a member of the Washington Institute for Near East Policy's Board of Advisors.

References

External links
The Spine, Martin Peretz's blog at The New Republic"Marty Peretz's Word Power", SlateSohrab Ahmari. Martin Peretz: From Truman to McGovern to Obama, Wall Street Journal'', 3 August 2012

1938 births
Jewish American journalists
American male journalists
American people of Polish-Jewish descent
American Zionists
Brandeis University alumni
Harvard University alumni
Harvard University faculty
Journalists from New York City
Living people
The Bronx High School of Science alumni
The New Republic people
American mass media company founders
American technology company founders
The Washington Institute for Near East Policy
Neoconservatism